Kenneth Hodges (born February 11, 1952) is an American politician. He is a former member of the South Carolina House of Representatives from the 121st District, serving from 2005 until 2017. He is a member of the Democratic Party.

References

Living people
1950 births
Democratic Party members of the South Carolina House of Representatives
21st-century American politicians